The 2018 Horizon League men's soccer tournament was the 31st edition of the tournament. The tournament will decide the Horizon League champion and guaranteed representative into the 2018 NCAA Division I Men's Soccer Championship.  The tournament will be begin on November 5 and conclude on November 10.

UIC are the defending champions.

UIC successfully defended their championship, beating Wright State 3–1 in the final.

Seeds

Bracket

Results

First round

Semifinals

Final

Statistics

Goals

All Tournament Team

References

External links 
 2018 Horizon League Men's Soccer Championship Central

Horizon League Men's Soccer Tournament
Horizon League Men's Socccer
Horizon League Men's Soccer
Horizon League Men's Soccer